Winsford is a town and civil parish in the unitary authority of Cheshire West and Chester and the ceremonial county of Cheshire, England, on the River Weaver south of Northwich and west of Middlewich. It grew around the salt mining industry after the river was canalised in the 18th century, allowing freight to be conveyed northwards to the Port of Runcorn on the River Mersey. The town of Winsford has an estimated population of 35,000 in 2023.

Winsford is split into three areas: Over on the western side of the River Weaver, Wharton on the eastern side, and Swanlow and Dene.

History

Early origins

Winsford consists of three ancient parishes, St Chads, Over and Wharton, which in the 19th century were combined. The name “Winsford” is of uncertain origin but is thought to derive from Wain’s or Wynne’s and Ford (Mr Wain's crossing point of the river Weaver).

The Norman Earls of Chester had a hunting lodge or summer palace at Darnhall in Over parish.  There was an enclosed area where deer and wild boar were kept to be hunted by the Earl and his guests. King Henry III annexed the title and its lands and spent time at Darnhall. In 1270 at the behest of his son, Henry III gave the estate to the Cistercians, who built Darnhall Abbey in 1274. However the land was not suitable for the grand scale of building envisaged, and the locals were not cooperative, so the monks left Darnhall to found Vale Royal Abbey in Whitegate in 1281.

A charter to hold a Wednesday market and an annual fair at Over was granted on 24 November 1280 by Edward I to the Abbot and convent of Vale Royal Abbey. From this charter can be traced the origins of the market that is still held in the town.

Expansion
Winsford began to significantly expand after 1721, when parliament gave permission for locks and other improvements on the River Weaver to go ahead which allowed sea-going vessels to reach Winsford from the port of Liverpool. At first, this was the closest that barges carrying china clay from Cornwall could get to the Potteries district of north Staffordshire. Locally produced salt was also transported to the Potteries, for use in the manufacture of salt-glazed stoneware. Finished ceramics from the Potteries were brought back to Winsford, for export through the Port of Liverpool. That trade ended in the 1780s when the Trent and Mersey Canal opened and carried the goods through Middlewich, bypassing Winsford. The canalised River Weaver was the inspiration for the Duke of Bridgewater's canals, and later the engineer for the Weaver Navigation, Edwin Leader Williams, designed and built the Manchester Ship Canal.

Railways came relatively early to Winsford, with the opening of Winsford station on the Grand Junction Railway in 1837. In his guide to the line, pushed that year, Arthur Freeling wrote:

From the 1830s, salt became important to Winsford, partly because the salt mines under Northwich had begun to collapse and another source of salt near the River Weaver was needed. A new source was discovered in Winsford, leading to the development of a salt industry along the course of the River Weaver, where many factories were established. As a result, a new town developed within  of the old Borough of Over which had been focused on Delamere Street. Most of the early development took place on the other side of the river, with new housing, shops, pubs, chapels and a new church being built in the former hamlet of Wharton. Many of the buildings built in the 19th century were built using timber frame construction because of the risk of salt subsidence.

Winsford Urban District Council came into being in 1894, administering the areas of Over and Wharton.

20th century

By the Second World War, employment in the salt trade had declined as one company took control of all the salt works and introduced methods of manufacture that needed much less labour. Slum clearance started in the 1930s and, by the 1950s three new housing estates had been built on both sides of the river to replace sub-standard homes. However, even in the 1960s, Winsford could be described as "one long line of mainly terraced houses from the station to Salterswall".

The town experienced a major expansion in the late 1960s and 1970s with its designation as an Expanded Town under the Town Development Act 1952 to take excess 'overspill' population from Liverpool.  This saw the development of two new industrial areas on both sides of the town, new estates of council and private housing and a new shopping centre with a library, sports centre, civic hall and doctors' surgeries. But the town's population did not grow as much as planned, so the new civic buildings were too large for the population.

Vale Royal Borough Council was formed in 1974, covering Winsford, Northwich and a large rural area of mid-Cheshire. In 1991, the council moved its main office from Northwich to a purpose-built headquarters in Winsford, which since April 2009 has been used by its successor authority Cheshire West and Chester Council. The same building also houses Winsford Town Council. Since then both Cheshire Fire Service (in 1997) and Cheshire Police (in 2003) have moved headquarters from the county town of Chester to Winsford.

Governance

Political representation
Currently there are two layers of local government with responsibility for Winsford, Cheshire West and Chester Council, and the town council. There used to be three tiers, however Vale Royal Borough Council and Cheshire County Council were abolished on 31 March 2009. The town falls within the Eddisbury constituency in Parliament, and has been represented by Edward Timpson since 2019.

Winsford is served by Cheshire Police and forms part of Northwich Local Policing Unit.

Geography

A small area in the south of the civil parish falls within the Weaver Valley Area of Special County Value.

Weather
Winsford's climate is temperate with few extremes.  The average temperature is slightly above the average for the United Kingdom, as is the average amount of sunshine. The average annual rainfall is slightly below the average for the United Kingdom. On an annual basis there are few days when snow lies on the ground, although there are some days of air frost.

Economy

Rock salt

The United Kingdom's largest rock salt (halite) mine is in Winsford. It is one of only three places where rock salt is commercially mined in the United Kingdom, the others being at Boulby Mine, North Yorkshire, and Kilroot, near Carrickfergus, Northern Ireland.

Rock salt was laid down in this part of North West England 220 million years ago, during the Triassic geological period. Seawater moved inland from an open sea, creating a chain of shallow salt lakes across what is today the Cheshire Basin.  As the lakes evaporated, deep deposits of rock salt were formed.

Extraction began at Winsford in the 17th century. At first it was used only as salt licks for animals, and to strengthen weak brine. In 1844 Winsford Rock Salt Mine was opened, and is claimed by its operator, Salt Union Ltd., to be "Britain's oldest working mine". Salt Union Ltd. is part of the US-owned group of companies Compass Minerals. Today, rock salt is quarried from a depth of more than 150 metres, producing salt (commonly known as "grit") for use as a de-icing agent on roads.

A worked-out part of the mine is operated by DeepStore Ltd., a records management company offering a secure storage facility. Confidential government files, hospital patient records, historic archives belonging to The National Archives, and business data are stored in the mine, where the dry and stable atmosphere provides ideal conditions for long-term document storage.

Retail
Supermarkets Asda and Aldi are in the town centre, Morrisons and Co-op are in Wharton and Tesco is in Over. There are branches of various national chain stores. The shopping centre is a 1970s design, with retail units and a multistorey car park subsequently added. In 2018 Winsford Cross Shopping Centre was bought by Cheshire West and Chester council for approximately £20 million.

The Jiffy Bag has traditionally been manufactured in the town and sells to packaging businesses as well as retail and post offices.

Local media
Winsford has one local newspaper, the weekly Winsford and Middlewich Guardian, published by the Newsquest Media Group). The town used to be served by a second weekly paper, the Mid-Cheshire Chronicle, published by Trinity Mirror, but the title ceased publication on 30 September 2009.

A community radio station, Cheshire FM, broadcast from studios in Winsford to the mid-Cheshire region of Northwich, Winsford and Middlewich from 30 March 2007 to January 2012. Mid-Cheshire Radio launched online in January 2013.

Traffic and local news is now provided by BBC Radio Manchester, Signal 1, Silk FM, Capital Manchester and Capital North West and Wales

Infrastructure

BT have a large employment base in the town. The Winsford telephone exchange is a main handover point and provides fibre broadband services to Winsford, Moulton, Whitegate, Tarporley, Middlewich, Sandbach, Holmes Chapel, Lower Withington and Sandiway. It also provides the main critical national infrastructure circuits to Cheshire Police HQ, plus Leighton, Macclesfield, Chester, Warrington and Halton hospitals, as well as numerous telephone masts, schools and doctors' surgeries across Cheshire.

The National Grid also have a main transmission station on Winsford Industrial Estate, which provides power to approximately 25,000 homes across the Winsford and Middlewich area.

An aqueduct maintained by United Utilities runs from Lake Vyrnwy near Oswestry to the outskirts of Winsford, where a large pumping station on Woodford Lane West provides water to Winsford, Middlewich and southern Northwich.

Landmarks

St Chad's Church
This church, off Swanlow Lane, is the most well-known local historical landmark.  One of the most popular local stories is that St Chad's Church was built in Over Square, but the devil was so angry at the people's use of it that he decided to fly off with it. The monks at Vale Royal Abbey were said to have seen him and rung the abbey bells so that it was dropped at its current location. In fact, its location is probably due to it having always belonged, along with its tithes, to St Mary's Convent in Chester.

Stone (or 'Saxon') Cross
By St John's Church of England Primary School, on Delamere Street, is a rare (possibly unique) lock-up/monument built in the 19th century.  The building is in the form of a stepped pyramid surmounted by a cross. The door to the lock-up is still visible but was blocked up in the 1970s.

Many invented tales of buried treasure and secret passages are told about the cross but none is true. The nearby street name of Saxon Crossway was invented by the Borough Council in the 1960s. The real Saxon cross is preserved at St Chad's Church.

Winsford Flashes

The Winsford Flashes are the town's most notable geographical feature. In referring to them as the "Cheshire Broads", a comparison is made with the better-known Norfolk Broads. "Flash" is an English dialect word for "lake", with a regional distribution centred on the northwest counties of Cheshire and Lancashire. The Winsford Flashes (Top Flash, Middle Flash, and Bottom Flash, the largest) are three lakes along the course of the River Weaver, extending over some 200 acres (80 hectares). They formed in the 19th century (cartographical evidence dates their formation to between 1845 and 1872), due to the subsidence of surface ground into underground voids. The voids were largely the result of brine extraction, in which rock salt deposits were dissolved and washed out by water. As the ground slumped into the voids, the River Weaver widened at each point, until lakes were made where arable land had once been. From the late 19th century, Winsford Flashes became popular with working class day-trippers from the nearby industrial centres of Manchester and the Staffordshire Potteries. Visitors came in large numbers for a day's leisure boating, picknicking, and sightseeing.

However, the Winsford Flashes were never developed as a public amenity, and their popularity soon fell into decline.  Today, they are primarily enjoyed by the local community, and are used for sailing (Winsford Flash Sailing Club is based on the 90 acre (35 hectare) Bottom Flash), fishing, and walking. They support a wide range of wildlife, with several species of migrant wildfowl, such as Canada geese, using them as an over-winter destination.

Other landmarks

St John's Church on Delamere Street dates from 1863 when Lord Delamere of Vale Royal commissioned the young Sandiway architect John Douglas to build it as a memorial to his deceased wife. This is the tallest building on the highest part of Over, so the spire can be seen for miles around.

The Brunner Guildhall, which now houses the Citizens Advice Bureau, was built in the late 19th century. It is a two-storey building built in Flemish Gothic style, and carries the date 1899. It was built by Sir John Tomlinson Brunner, who gave it to Winsford Urban District Council, to be used for Trade and Friendly Societies, and other public purposes. It was given its name by the chairman of the council in recognition of Brunner's generosity.

Parts of the Knights Grange pub, Grange Lane, which was once a farmhouse and belonged to Vale Royal Abbey, were built in the 17th century.

Littler Grange, now a children's nursery, is the best remaining half-timber building in Winsford, including sloping floors on part of the first floor.

Dawk House on Swanlow Lane is a largely unaltered timber framed farm, covered in white stucco probably during the reign of Queen Anne, including the date 1711.

Blue Bell Inn by St Chad's Church, now also a children's nursery, is an exact replica of a medieval building that burned down in the 1960s.

Transport
Winsford railway station, on the Liverpool to Birmingham main line, is one mile (1.5 km) east of the centre of the town, in Wharton. The town at one time had two other railway stations: Winsford and Over, on a branch from the Mid-Cheshire Line near Cuddington, and Over and Wharton, on a branch from the Liverpool to Birmingham line.

Winsford was the location of a fatal railway accident in 1948 and a further, non-fatal, accident in 1999. 

The M6 motorway at junction 18 at Middlewich is the nearest motorway link, with the A54 connecting the town to it.

The nearest airports are Liverpool John Lennon Airport and Manchester Airport.

The town has a bus network run by bus company Arriva, with buses to Crewe and Northwich.

Education
Fourteen schools in Winsford work together as part of the Winsford Education Partnership where they share resources and co-ordinate planning.

Primary schools

 Darnhall Primary School Current pupils on school roll – 333
 Grange Primary School Current pupils on school roll – 238
 Oak View Academy Current pupils on school roll – 178
 Winsford High Street Community Primary School Current pupils on school roll – 297
 Overhall Primary School Current pupils on school roll – 203
 St. Chad's C of E Primary School Current pupils on school roll – 185
 St. Josephs' Roman Catholic Primary School – 276
 Wharton CofE Infant and Junior School Current pupils on school roll – 604
 Willow Wood Community Primary School Current pupils on school roll – 206
Over St Johns CofE Primary School – 136

Secondary schools

 The Winsford Academy; established via the amalgamation of Verdin High School and Woodford Lodge High School in September 2010
Hebden Green Community School
Oaklands School

Colleges
 Warrington and Vale Royal College

Religious sites

All the following churches in Winsford are members of the Winsford Churches Together, which includes:

 Christ Church, Wharton, Crook Lane
 St Andrew's Methodist Church, Dingle Lane
 St Chad's Church, Over, off Swanlow Lane
 St John the Evangelist's Church, Winsford, Delamere Street
 St Joseph's Catholic Church, Woodford Lane
 The Salvation Army, Weaver Street
 Trinity Methodist Church, Station Road
 Over United Reformed Church, Over Square, Swanlow Lane
 River of Life Church, Queens Parade
 Living Waters Christian Fellowship, Dingle Centre and Queen's Parade

Sports and recreation
The town has a non-league football team, Winsford United, which plays in the North West Counties Football League Premier Division. The Blues (after the colour of their shirts) play at Barton Stadium. Neville Southall once played for the club.

In March 2019 Winsford was chosen for the site of the £70m Cheshire FA Centre of Excellence, which will be the new home of the England Women's Football Team. It will also act as a training base for European teams playing in Liverpool and Manchester. The development was delayed by the COVID-19 pandemic in April 2020. In October 2020 the Prime Minister Boris Johnson gave his support for the development to go ahead; planning applications are expected to be submitted to Cheshire West and Chester Council in spring 2021 with a possible opening date of 2023.

Winsford ASC is a swimming club which has achieved Swim21 club status and won the North West Division 1 speedo league. It has now been promoted to the premier league.

Vale Royal Athletic Club is based mainly in Northwich and Winsford, and has several international athletes training with them. This club was created in its present form by the merger, in 1994, of the Mid Cheshire Athletic Club and Winsford Athletic Club.

The youth football teams are Winsford Junior Blues, Winsford Over 3 and Winsford diamonds.

Winsford Cricket Club play in the Meller Braggins Cheshire Cricket League, which forms part of the Cheshire pyramid. Winsford have had a cricket team since 1888 when the team was founded by ICI workers and played at the Dingle, next to the Palace Picture House (now Palace Bingo). In 1991 Winsford moved to Knights Grange to allow the Council to build the new council offices (Wyvern House).

Allotment gardens at Moss Bank, Over, date from 1924, when William Stubbs of 'Leahlands', Swanlow Lane, sold a  field behind High Street to Winsford Urban District Council, 'for the purpose of the Allotments Act'. The field, named on the 1846 Over Parish Tithe Map as 'Well Field', had been farmed since at least the 17th century, and its conversion to allotments secured its use for future generations. The site shrank in the 1960s and 1970s with the building of housing and an electricity sub-station along Moss Bank, but the acquisition in 1970 of land adjacent to Over Recreation Ground brought it to its present size.

In the late 1980s, a record-breaking pumpkin was grown on the allotments. Weighing in at 579 lb (263 kg), it held the national record for a time.

The allotments (about 50 plots and 5 raised beds) are owned and managed by Winsford Town Council. The plot-holders have their own organisation, Over Allotments and Leisure Gardeners' Association. Lottery funding has enabled a programme of on-going improvements since 2002, the most recent grant being in 2007 from the Awards for All scheme for £6,940.

Winsford Flash Sailing Club is situated on Bottom Flash, the largest of the town's three flashes. The club was founded as Northwich Sailing Club in 1931, and moved to Winsford in 1934.

The Brighton Belle pub was known as the Railway Inn until 1972, when a Pullman carriage from the Brighton Belle train was added to function as a restaurant. In the next 26 years the carriage became a local landmark until it was removed in 1998 because the cost of refurbishment in situ was prohibitive.

Notable people
 John Bishop (born 1966), comedian, grew up partially in Winsford.
 Sir John Bradbury, 1st Baron Bradbury (1872–1950), British Treasury official, born in Winsford.
 John Brittleton (1906–1982), footballer, born in Winsford.
 Sam Brittleton (1885–1951), footballer, born in Winsford.
 Tom Brittleton (1882–1955), footballer, born in Winsford.
 Clare Calbraith (born 1974), actress, born in Winsford.
 James Clarke VC (1894–1947), recipient of the Victoria Cross in World War I, born in Winsford.
 George Daniels (1912–1984), footballer, born in Winsford.
 Simon Davies (born 1974), footballer, born in Winsford.
 Daniel Fox (born 1986), footballer, born in Winsford.
 Gareth Griffiths (born 1970), footballer, born in Winsford.
 David Hanson (born 1957), Labour Party MP, educated at Verdin County Comprehensive School.
 Sandy MacIver (born 1998), footballer, born in Winsford.
 Nicky Maynard (born 1986), footballer, born in Winsford.
 Robert Nixon, 18th-century so-called "prophet", reputedly born in Winsford.
 Alan Oakes (born 1942), footballer and football manager, born in Winsford.
 Jack Oakes (1905–1992), footballer, born in Winsford.
 Glyn Pardoe (1946–2020), footballer, born in Winsford.
 Gertrude Maud Robinson (1886–1954), organic chemist, born in Winsford.
 Colin Rose (born 1972), footballer, born in Winsford.
 Stan Wood (1905–1967), footballer, born in Winsford.o
 Evan Mitchell- Disability rights campaigner

Twin town
Winsford is twinned with:

 Deuil-la-Barre, France (since 1993).

Winsford also has an informal "friendship link" with:

 Nieder-Eschbach, Germany, which is itself twinned with Deuil-la-Barre.

See also

 Listed buildings in Winsford
 Rail accidents in Winsford (disambiguation)
 Salt in Cheshire – summary of Cheshire's salt industry.

Notes and references

Further reading

 – a general introduction to the town's history.
 – Mainly photographs with captions 
 – who fought in the First World War from the congregation of St Chad's and what happened to them.
 – a fictional account of Winsford in the 20th century.

 – A list of all those who served in the First World War.

External links

 Winsford Council
 Winsford & District Historical Society

 
History of Cheshire
Towns in Cheshire
Civil parishes in Cheshire